The Patriotic Order of Merit (German: Vaterländischer Verdienstorden, or VVO) was a national award granted annually in the German Democratic Republic (GDR). It was founded in 1954 and was awarded to individuals and institutions for outstanding contributions to the state and society in various areas of life.

Classes 
  Honor clasp, in Gold
  Gold, 1st class
  Silver, 2nd class
  Bronze, 3rd class

The award 

The official language for the award stipulated it was given "for outstanding merit":
 "in the struggle of the German and international labor movement and in the fight against fascism,"
 "in the establishment, consolidation and fortification of the German Democratic Republic,"
 "in the fight to secure peace and advance the international influence of the German Democratic Republic".

The order was awarded in bronze, silver, gold and gold honor clasp (for exceptional merit). Each level was only awarded once and with the exception of the recipient of the honor clasp, all recipients received a sum of money.

Notable recipients
 Vasily Chuikov, Marshal of the Soviet Union
 Paula Hertwig, 1956
 Klaus Köste, 1972
 Katarina Witt, 1984 (Gold) and 1988 (gold honor clasp)
 Klaus Fuchs

See also 
 Orders, decorations, and medals of East Germany

References

Orders, decorations, and medals of East Germany
Awards established in 1954
1954 establishments in East Germany